Didzis Skuška (born 18 July 1968) is a Latvian bobsledder. He competed in the four man event at the 1994 Winter Olympics.

References

1968 births
Living people
Latvian male bobsledders
Olympic bobsledders of Latvia
Bobsledders at the 1994 Winter Olympics
People from Jūrmala